Karl Zilgas (2 March 1882 – 17 June 1917) was a German international footballer.

References

1882 births
1917 deaths
German footballers
Association football forwards
Germany international footballers
SC Victoria Hamburg players
German military personnel killed in World War I